Konkhra is a Danish death metal/extreme metal band formed in Køge in 1989.

History 
Konkhra is an extreme metal band from Denmark who blend death metal, groove metal, mid-tempo, and thrash. They are often compared to Machine Head, Entombed, Pantera, Bolt Thrower, and Morbid Angel.
The name "Konkhra" is derived from the sound that Tom Angelripper from Sodom makes when he introduces the song "Conqueror" on the 1988 album Mortal Way of Live.

1989: The band formed under the name Vicious Circle before changing names to Konkra. Their 1990 demo is named Konkhra.

1991: Their second demo Malgrowth was released.

1992: Their first official record Stranded was released on Progress Records, limited to 3,000 copies. 

1993: The first full-length album Sexual Affective Disorder was released on Progress Records.

1995: The album Spit or Swallow was released. It was recorded at Sunlight Studio in Stockholm and produced by Dismember drummer Fred Estby and Tomas Skogsberg. This record made Konkhra the best-selling band on Progress Records.

1997: The next album was called Weed out the Weak and had James Murphy (ex-Testament, Obituary) on guitar and Chris Kontos (ex-Machine Head, Testament, Exodus) on drums. The album was released on Metal Blade for the U.S. market.

2003: The album Reality Check was released on the Italian label Code666.

2009: Nothing is Sacred featured James Murphy on guitar again. It was released on Konkhra's own label Chopshop Records.

2018: The album Weed out the Weak was re-issued on Hammerheart Records.

2019: The album Alpha and the Omega was released on Hammerheart Records.

Konkhra has toured with many bands in Denmark, South Africa, U.S., Europe, and Israel, including Fear Factory, Brutal Truth, Suffocation, Meatlocker, Deicide, Immolation, Cannibal Corpse, Napalm Death, Behemoth, Volbeat, Batushka, Malevolent Creation, King Diamond, and more.

Discography

Studio albums
Sexual Affective Disorder (1993)
Spit or Swallow (1995)
Weed Out the Weak (1997)
Come Down Cold (1999)
Reality Check (2003)
Nothing Is Sacred (2009)
Weed Out the Weak (re-issue) (2018)
Alpha and the Omega (2019)

Live albums
Live Eraser (1996)

Videos
Homegrowth (1996)

EPs
Stranded (1992)
The Facelift EP (1994)
The Freakshow (1999)

Demos
The Vicious Circle (1990)
Malgrowth (1991)
Persistence (2005)

Members
Current
 Anders Lundemark – vocals, guitar (1989–present)
 Martin R. Patterson  - bass (1991–1992, 2014–present)
 Johnny Nielsen – drums (1993–1996, 2002–2003, 2014–present)
 Kim 'Hakim' Mathiesen – guitar (1994–1996, 2002–2003, 2015–present)

Former
 Claus Vedel – vocals, guitar (1989–1994)
 Jon Clausen – drums (1990–1992)
 Thomas "Gnist" Christensen – bass (1996–1999)
 Chris Kontos – drums (1996–1997)
 Per Möller Jensen – drums (1997–2000)
 James Murphy – guitar (1997-1999, 2009)
 Søren Hee Johansen - bass (1993)
 Lars Schmidt - bass (1993–1996, 1999–2009)
 Mads Lauridsen - drums (2004–2010)
 Michael Skovbakke - guitar (2010–2015)

Timeline

References

External links
 
 Konkhra at MusicMight
 Konkhra kan stadig, efter 20 års død(metal) og ødelæggelse! 
 Konkhra.com

Danish death metal musical groups
Musical groups established in 1989
Danish thrash metal musical groups